As a candidate country of the European Union, North Macedonia (MK) is included in the Nomenclature of Territorial Units for Statistics (NUTS). The three NUTS levels are:
 NUTS-1: MK0 North Macedonia
 NUTS-2: MK00 North Macedonia
 NUTS-3: 8 Statistical regions
 MK001 Vardarski
 MK002 Istočen
 MK003 Jugozapaden
 MK004 Jugoistočen
 MK005 Pelagoniski
 MK006 Pološki
 MK007 Severoistočen
 MK008 Skopski

Below the NUTS levels, there are two LAU levels (LAU-1: municipalities; LAU-2: settlements).

See also
 ISO 3166-2 codes of North Macedonia
 FIPS region codes of North Macedonia

Sources
 Hierarchical list of the Nomenclature of territorial units for statistics - NUTS and the Statistical regions of Europe
 Overview map of CC (Candidate countries) - Statistical regions at level 1
 Macedonia - Statistical regions at level 2
 Macedonia - Statistical regions at level 3
 Correspondence between the regional levels and the national administrative units
 Municipalities of Macedonia, Statoids.com

Macedonia
Subdivisions of North Macedonia